Schützenpanzer Lang HS.30, formally Schützenpanzer, lang, Typ 12-3, or SPz lg 12-3 for short (German for "Infantry-tank, long, Type 12-3"), was a West German infantry fighting vehicle developed from 1956 to 1958. It was a Swiss Hispano-Suiza design, with a Rolls-Royce engine. After some early mechanical problems, only 2,176 were built of the 10,680 planned. It was armed with a powerful 20 mm autocannon, a common choice for infantry fighting vehicles of the period.

Its design proved to have many flaws and drawbacks, and the construction was followed by a major political scandal in West Germany in the 1960s. 2,176 SPz HS.30 and variants were built until 1962, for which the German government paid 517 million DM; about 238,000 DM per vehicle. The HS.30 first entered service with the Panzergrenadier battalions in 1960 and was replaced by the Marder infantry fighting vehicle from 1971.

Design and doctrine 
Rejecting American doctrine that an armored personnel carrier should serve as a "battlefield taxi" and not as an assault vehicle, the Germans developed the HS.30 as a vehicle to fight alongside tanks and from which their mechanized infantry could fight from under cover. The German military came to this decision as a result of its World War II experience with Panzergrenadiere (armored infantry). German doctrine saw the SPz 12-3 as part of the squad's equipment, and the squad was trained to fight with the vehicle in both offense and defense. Unlike the American M113, the HS.30 could not float, but as German doctrine envisaged the HS.30 as a component in operations combined with main battle tanks that also lacked such a capability, this was not seen as a grave disadvantage.

The HS.30 mounted a small turret with a Hispano-Suiza HS.820 20-mm autocannon and a 15×15 periscopic sight. The role of the 20-mm autocannon in German doctrine was to engage helicopters, anti-tank weapons, and light armored vehicles, thus freeing tanks to concentrate their fire against other tanks. Even with the turret, the HS.30 was fully two feet (0.6 m) lower in height than the M113 - making it a smaller target. The vehicle had an onboard supply of 2,000 rounds of 20 mm ammunition.  Frontal armor provided protection against 20-mm projectiles, which was better than comparable vehicles of other nations.  The additional armor made the HS.30 four tons heavier than the M113, even though it could only carry half as many troops.  For the squad members to fire their personal weapons while mounted, roof hatches had to be opened with the soldiers sticking up out of the hatches.  The Germans considered this a significant disadvantage as their likely opponent, the Soviet Army, was expected to use chemical agents in any war between NATO and the Warsaw Pact.

Despite the German army's insistence on a true infantry fighting vehicle rather than just an armored personnel carrier, the Panzergrenadier brigades included an infantry battalion that was carried initially on trucks and later with M113 APCs. This force composition likely resulted as much from cost considerations as it did from doctrine that called for one third of the Panzergrenadiere to be a motorized force.

The HS.30 and its contemporaries

Politics, service and reliability issues

Political decision making 
The acquisition of equipment for the newly formed Bundeswehr in its early years was driven by military, economical and political factors. The military requirements pointed to a vehicle like the French AMX-13 VTP, but its cost per unit was too high. The US M59 armored personnel carrier on the other hand was too heavy and too tall for the envisioned doctrine. Also problematic was West German industry lack of interest in building weapons - as a result of World War II, Germany was still forbidden to export arms, so the investment for developing an AFV, to pay for tooling, or the training of the workforce would not generate any future revenue from exports. So for political considerations, it seemed reasonable to turn to West Germany's allies to order AFVs and support their struggling economies. The Schützenpanzer SPz 11-2 Kurz (developed from the Hotchkiss SP1A) was ordered from France and, after a deal to acquire the Centurion from the United Kingdom became obsolete when the US provided M41 Walker Bulldog and M47 Patton tanks as military aid, forming a consortium, to build the new AFV partially in Britain, as offered by Hispano-Suiza in 1955, seemed appealing.

The Hispano-Suiza offer matched all the requirements, laid out by the German Federal Ministry of Defence and, with an estimated cost of only 170,000 DM, the price per unit was 30% lower than the AMX VTP. In combination with time pressure, generated by the promise to NATO to form and equip 12 West German divisions until 1960, the German Ministry of Defence opted for the Hispano-Suiza model and placed orders for 10,680 AFVs. Dieter H. Kollmar concludes in his analysis of the acquisition process, that it seems reasonable to assume that the company had learned about the requirements in advance and adjusted their offer accordingly. Hispano-Suiza itself did not have the facilities to build an AFV. It had acquired patents for a 20-mm auto cannon and used them in conjunction with its network of business contacts around Europe to finalize the AFV plans. Lobbyists, often recruited from the ranks of former Wehrmacht officers, aggressively solicited for Hispano-Suiza with the decision makers in the Ministry of Defence, who often shared the same background.

When the Ministry of Defence, under its new secretary Franz Josef Strauss, learned from the HS.30 evaluation on the proving grounds in 1958 about multiple shortcomings of the vehicle, it became increasingly impatient with Hispano-Suiza and cut the initial order of 10,680 down to 2,800, with 1,089 to be built by Leyland Motors in the United Kingdom, the rest by Henschel and Hanomag in Germany. A settlement with Hispano-Suiza was reached in 1960, with the German state paying 40 million DM to compensate for investments and lost revenue.

Later a series of disclosures by the press, several hearings and an investigation evolved around the acquisition of the HS.30. Witnesses, like the former ambassador of Germany in Switzerland Friedrich Holzapfel, were heard and a story about potential payments made to individuals and political parties was spread, based on claims made by the then lobbyist and 1930s Weimar Republic secretary Gottfried Treviranus and businessman Werner Plappert. According to Dieter H. Kollmar, the progress of the official investigation was hampered by witnesses just craving for recognition and charlatans. Accusations, made in that context against Franz Josef Strauss, later proved to be false. Kollmar saw the problems with the HS.30 in the fraudulent practises of Hispano-Suiza and insufficient controlling processes in the Federal Ministry of Defences procurement plans.

Reliability problems 

After a series of substantial upgrades, the HS.30 was stated in the 1960s by the official committee of investigation to fulfill the army's requirements ″conditionally″ („bedingt“). In 1965 some 65 percent of the vehicles were reported to be operational, by 1968 the number had increased to 85 percent. The problems with the early models on the other hand had been so severe, that the Ministry of Defence had to provide its own technical personnel to bring the AFVs to an operational status. The evaluation report quotes expert witnesses and listed some technical problems with the HS.30:

Transmission - the early production models were equipped with a SIDEBI- and later a Wilson-transmission, which both caused problems and were finally replaced on all vehicles with an Allison transmission in 1965/1966.
Tracks - the Hispano-Suiza tracks were reported to be an outdated design. A witness told the investigators the tracks were prone to excessive wear, so that elements had to be removed frequently to compensate for track sag. Several witnesses preferred the tracks produced by the Backhaus KG (later a part of Diehl Metall), which were later put on all HS.30 as upgrades.

Other problems were a result of the design:

Speed - The Rolls-Royce B81 was reported to be underpowered, especially compared to the later Leopard 1 tank, but when it was introduced, the HS.30 had a power-to-weight ratio in theory comparable with the M41 tank it was supposed to work with. But, according to a technical officer heard by the committee, the suspension on the front roadwheels was too weak to compensate the AFVs weight when going cross country and hitting ditches, causing the helical springs to break from the coilovers. As a result, drivers had to drive carefully, limiting the vehicle effectively to some 15–20 km/h (10-12.5 mph) off-road. Hispano-Suiza itself stated in the original requirements, that the Bundeswehr had called for 20 hp per ton, which would have been satisfied by a  engine on the initial 10 ton design, but the Ministry of Defence had asked for a thicker armor of 30 mm front and 20 mm on the sides, opted for a heavier armament package of 800 kg instead the original 200 kg and wanted a complete group of Panzergrenadiers as passengers, which made the vehicle longer and heavier.
Engine maintenance - the entire rear section of the HS.30 had to be pulled out of the vehicle to get full access to the engine, including the removal of both tracks, some 64 bolts and all connections, making it a time-consuming work, compared to more modern vehicles.
Disembarking - the infantry could exit the HS.30 using two large hatches on top, an escape hatch in the floor and, based on initial planning, a door on the back. That door did stay on the AFV, but it had become effectively unusable for troops, with the designers blocking the tunnel, between the door and troop compartment with engine related components. The remaining standard way to exit was to climb out on top and jump over the sides. This not only exposed soldiers to potential enemy fire, but was also dangerous because the tracks stood out from the hull.

Service 
The HS.30 AFV was introduced into the Bundeswehr in late 1959 but suffered from teething problems. The AFV was initially used to equip only individual battalions which co-existed in the 1960s with two other forms of Grenadier formations who were equipped with trucks or APCs.

Starting in 1974, the Marder IFV replaced the HS.30 in German armored infantry units. Peru received around 20 SPz HS.30s during the 1970s. Finally, some HS.30's were used as armored targets on gunnery ranges.

Variants 

Schützenpanzer, lang, Typ 12-3, (SPz lg 12-3, Gruppe) – Standard IFV variant
Schützenpanzer, lang, Typ 12-3, mit 106 mm Leichtgeschütz M40A1, (SPz lg 12-3, LGs M40A1, Panzerabwehr) – Tank destroyer version with a 106 mm M40A1 recoilless rifle mounted on the roof in addition to the 20 mm cannon. Retrofit from 1965.
Schützenpanzer, lang, Typ 21-3, (SPz lg 21-3, FüFu) – Radio and command version
Schützenpanzer, lang, Typ 51-3, (SPz lg 51-3, Panzermörser) – Self-propelled mortar version with an 81 mm mortar. Retrofit to Type 52–3 in 1966.
Schützenpanzer, lang, Typ 52-3, (SPz lg 52-3, Panzermörser) – Self-propelled mortar version with a 120 mm mortar. Retrofit of Type 51-3 from 1966.
Schützenpanzer, lang, Typ 81-3, (SPz lg 81-3, FLtPzArt) – Artillery forward observer version.
Jagdpanzer, Typ 1-3, (JPz 1-3, Kanonenjagdpanzer) – Tank destroyer prototype based on the HS.30 chassis. Armed with a 90 mm DEFA cannon.
Raketenjagdpanzer, Typ 3-3, (RakJPz 3-3, Raketenjagdpanzer) – Missile armed tank destroyer vehicle based on the HS.30 chassis. Equipped with wire-guided Nord SS.11 missiles.

Footnotes

References

Notes

Bibliography 
 
 Haworth, W. Blair. The Bradley and How It Got That Way, Greenwood Publishing Group, 1999. .
 Foss, Christopher (ed.) Jane's Armour and Artillery 1981-82, Jane's Publishing Company Limited, 1981. .

External links 

 SPz lang at Panzerbaer.de
 SPz lang photo gallery at Hartziel.de

Armoured fighting vehicles of Germany
Armoured personnel carriers
Tracked infantry fighting vehicles
Infantry fighting vehicles of the Cold War
Military vehicles introduced in the 1960s